Ehlie Luna (formerly known as Moxiie) is a Haitian-American recording artist, singer and songwriter.

Biography

2011: Breakthrough and Jungle Pop – EP
Luna brought out her self-created genre "Jungle Pop" with her first EP of the same name in December 2011, handling the songwriting exclusively. A month later, her track "Dancing in Dirt" landed on MTV's list of "buzzed-about" singles and Jon Ali's song of the week.

In August, she released her first remix EP called "Jungle Pop: The Trip", which contained songs off her debut EP, remixed by producers and DJs such as The Hustle Standard, Kavedo, LCR, The Fluu, and others.

She has worked with street artist and DJ, GREATecletic, who also remixed one of her songs "Ra Ra".

In late August, the 1995 UK Eurovision entrants, Love City Groove re-released their eponymous single, a No. 7 hit in 1995 which finished 10th in the contest. In this version, the rap verses were replaced and sung by Luna.

2012: Savage
In December 2012, with the release of her first studio album Savage, Luna evolved the jungle pop sound even co-producing. Art Nouveau Magazine called it a tour-de-force of a pop album. This independent artist finds herself at the center of a unique group of producers: Fredro (Wonder Girls, Sugababes), Reo (Beyoncé, Lil Wayne), Jay Easel (Miranda Lambert, Reggie Watts), Peter Wade (MNDR, Jennifer Lopez), The Hustle Standard (Rob Bailey) and more.

Savage spawned another MTV Buzzworthy moment with the track "Lay Down Your Crown".

She has appeared as guest vocals in tracks as "Timebombs" with Germanys Strobe and Jashari, which has amassed over 350,000 views on YouTube and in Wunderjax's "Dining with Kings", released in August 2012.

Luna featured on the track "Live Long", a DJ SAV's & BiG KiD Xavier production on SAV's You Are Not The Father – EP, released in July 2013 on Mad Decent. She's also featured on "Ah Yeah" with Brazil's own – The Kickstarts.

In June 2013, Luna announced that she had been working on a new EP, called ScandiRara, inspired in the late 80s and 90s reggae/dancehall style, and produced by Fredro. The ScandiRara – EP was released and streamed on August 20 via SoundCloud.

The title is inspired by the two worlds that came together to create this sound. Scandi (Scandinavian) for Swedish producer Fredro (Namie Amuro, Guy Sebastian, B. Smyth) and Rara for Luna's Haitian background. Rara is a type of festival music in Haiti. While it's often fueled by politics, Luna's spin on the concept is inspired by her memory of the only carnival she attended as a child in Haiti. "I was too young to understand lyrics, but I will never forget how it made me feel, re-creating and sharing that feeling was one of my goals with ScandiRara".

The EP features one of the most prominent artists in the international reggae/dancehall scene. Jamaican dancehall star and Major Lazer collaborator, Mr. Vegas, fresh off Beyonce's Standing on the Sun (Remix), was featured on 2 of the EP's 4 tracks. Famous for songs like Heads High, and most recently Bruk It Down, the MOBO award winner brought the energy Luna recalls dancing to in Brooklyn basements on days when she should've been in school.

ScandiRara is the first in a series of EPs in which Luna teams up with a few producers from the Savage album to explore specific sounds.

On September 30, it was released on Beatport a Ming (DJ) and Statik Link track, featuring Luna, called "Block Party".

On October 4, Luna released via Universal Records Australia, the "Dancing in Dirt – EP'''" on iTunes Australia, which contains a reworked version of "Dancing in Dirt", and 3 remixes by J-Trick, CTFO and Lost Soul. The song was featured on the Steve Madden Magazine on October 1.

Discography

Albums

EPs
 2011: Jungle Pop – EP 2013: ScandiRara – EPSingles
 2011: Bottle Service (feat. Marvin Priest)
 2012: Crash into Me 2012: Serial Killer 2012: Hell Outta Heaven 2012: Helluva Drug (feat. Kris Kasanova)
 2013: Dancing in Dirt 2014: Anyway 2014: Jilted 2016: Chaos 2017: Don't See You 2017: Complicated (feat. Swish Allnet)
 2017: So Far'' (feat. APSPDR+)

Notes

External links
 

Living people
American people of Haitian descent
Year of birth missing (living people)